Westminster Cathedral Choir School is a boarding and day preparatory school for 279 boys in the area of Victoria in the City of Westminster. It is one of two Roman Catholic cathedral schools in the United Kingdom, the other being St John's in Cardiff, Wales.

Curriculum
The school curriculum was rated as Excellent in the 2018 inspection. Many past pupils have gained entrance to some of the country's public schools including Eton College, Harrow School, St Paul's School and Westminster School.

Besides music, boys are taught English, maths, science, etc. and are required to learn French. In Year 8, pupils are prepared for the Common Entrance Examination.

Notable former pupils
Michael Berkeley – composer, broadcaster
John Landor – conductor
Colin Mawby – conductor, organist, composer

References

External links
 Official website
 Profile on the ISC website

Private boys' schools in London
Roman Catholic private schools in the Archdiocese of Westminster
Private schools in the City of Westminster
Cathedral schools
Preparatory schools in London
Choir schools in England
Educational institutions established in 1902
1902 establishments in England